Manoba grisealis is a moth in the family Nolidae. It was described by Charles Swinhoe in 1895. It is found in the north-eastern Himalayas.

References

Moths described in 1895
Nolinae